Camino Union Elementary School District is a public school district based in El Dorado County, California. It serves Pre-K through 8th grade.

References

External links
 

School districts in El Dorado County, California